Wilton Hall may refer to:

Will Hall, mental diversity advocate
Wilton E. Hall, former US Senator